Acontia lucida, the pale shoulder, is a moth of the family Noctuidae. The species was first described by Johann Siegfried Hufnagel in 1766.

Distribution and habitat
This species can be found in most of Europe, east to Turkey, Iran and India. It has also been recorded from Algeria. It is a rare migrant to the south coast of Great Britain. The pale shoulder can be found in grasslands, dry meadows, steppes, dunes and roadsides, where the host plants are present.

Description

The wingspan of Acontia lucida can reach 26–30 mm. Head, thorax and abdomen are white. The forewings show a greyish-white front part and a wide dark brown median band, dark mottled and marbled, larger in the centre. A white mark is present on the outer edge of the forewings, while a brown mark is close to the apex. Hindwings are whitish fuscous, with a brown band near the apex. Larvae are green or brown, with transversal whitish bands.

Biology
The larvae are polyphagous, feeding on various herbaceous plants, mainly on mallow (Malva species), common marshmallow (Althaea officinalis), field bindweed (Convolvulus arvensis), goosefoots (Chenopodium) and dandelion (Taraxacum).  Adults are on the wing on sunny days in May and August in two generations. They are attracted to light. This species overwinters as pupa below ground. Rarely it is a migrant species.

References

External links

 
 Lepiforum e. V.
 Encyclopedia of Life
 Acontia lucida in Germany 2013 - picture

lucida
Moths described in 1766
Moths of Africa
Moths of Asia
Moths of Europe
Taxa named by Johann Siegfried Hufnagel